Bilal al-Berjawi al-Lubnani (aka Abu Hafsa) was a terror suspect killed by a U.S. drone strike.

He was born in Beirut in September 1984. His parents took him to London where he grew up in St. John's Wood.

In 2006 he attended an al-Qaida training camp in Mogadishu.

In February 2009 he traveled with his Egyptian friend Mohammed Sakr to Kenya; both were detained and questioned separately. As early as October that same year they returned to East Africa, Somalia this time; in November, Ugandan authorities searched for them. According to his "martyr biography," al-Berjawi attended another training camp in Baidoa. His UK citizenship was revoked in 2010 by Theresa May. In 2011 he was probably injured in a drone strike near Kismayo.

On January 21, 2012, al-Berjawi was killed by a drone strike outside Mogadishu.

External links
https://theintercept.com/drone-papers/the-life-and-death-of-objective-peckham/
https://www.thebureauinvestigates.com/2013/03/15/parents-of-british-man-killed-by-us-drone-blame-uk-government/

Targeted killing
2012 deaths
Deaths in Somalia